"Ice in the Sunshine"  is a song by German pop group Beagle Music Ltd. Initially composed and recorded as a jingle for a 1985 Langnese cinema commercial, it gained massive popularity after its screenings and was subsequently released as a single in Germany in 1986, reaching the top ten. Lead vocals of the original jingle were done by Ian Cussick. The recordings for the single release feature a different singer.

In the 2000s, the song was revitalized when America singer Anastacia re-recorded the track for another Langnese commercial. It has since been covered by several artists for promotion, including No Angels, DJ Tomekk, Shaggy and The Bosshoss.

Track listings
 7" single
 "Ice in the Sunshine" — 3:01
 "Thin Ice" — 2:10

Charts

References

1986 singles
1985 songs
Songs based on jingles
No Angels songs
Anastacia songs